The Homicide Squad is a 1931 American pre-Code crime film directed by George Melford and Edward L. Cahn and written by John Thomas Neville, Charles Logue and Tom Reed. It is based on a 1928 Henry La Cossitt short story that originally ran in Adventure magazine. The film stars Leo Carrillo, Noah Beery, Sr., Mary Brian, Russell Gleason, George Brent and Walter Percival. The film was released on September 29, 1931, by Universal Pictures.

Cast
Leo Carrillo as Big Louie Grenado
Noah Beery as Captain Michael Buckley
Mary Brian as Millie O'Dowd 
Russell Gleason as Joe Riley 
George Brent as Jimmy Buckley
Walter Percival as Proctor 
J. Carrol Naish as Hugo
Pat O'Malley as Man

References

External links

American black-and-white films
1930s English-language films
1931 crime drama films
American crime drama films
Universal Pictures films
Films directed by George Melford
Films directed by Edward L. Cahn
1930s American films